Domingo González Pérez (August 3, 1842 – February 27, 1927) was a Costa Rican politician.

Vice presidents of Costa Rica
1842 births
1927 deaths